Johanna Maria Elisabeth "Jopie" Waalberg (13 April 1920 – 5 July 1979) was a Dutch breaststroke swimmer who competed in the 1936 Summer Olympics and was the first woman to swim the 200 meter breaststroke under 3 minutes.

In 1936 she finished fifth in the 200 metre breaststroke event, the single breaststroke event until the 1968 Olympics. At the 1938 European Aquatics Championships in London she won a bronze medal on the same distance.

On May 11, 1937 she broke Hideko Maehata's four-year-old breaststroke record by 0.2 seconds (3:00.2). On Jun 27 of that year, in Zaandijk, she improved on that record by more than 2 seconds to 2:58.0. She improved her own world record once more on October 2 to 2:56.9. She further held world records in the unconventional distances of 200 yard, 400 m and 500 m breaststroke.

External links
profile
profile (in Dutch)

1920 births
1979 deaths
Dutch female breaststroke swimmers
World record setters in swimming
Olympic swimmers of the Netherlands
Swimmers from Amsterdam
Swimmers at the 1936 Summer Olympics
European Aquatics Championships medalists in swimming